MU, Mu or μ may refer to:

Arts and entertainment

Film and television
 Aries Mu, a character from the anime Saint Seiya
 Mu La Flaga, a character from the anime Mobile Suit Gundam SEED
 Monsters University, a 2013 animated film by Disney and Pixar
 "μ's" (pronounced "Muse") is the name of the protagonist school idol group in the anime series Love Live!.

Gaming 
 Mu Online, a 2003 online role-playing game
 Mu, an ancient civilization from Mega Man Star Force 2.
 Mu-12, a character from the BlazBlue series
 Colony Mu, a location from Xenoblade Chronicles 3

Music
 Mu Performing Arts, an Asian-American theater company and taiko drumming ensemble
 MU (musician), Mutsumi Kanamori, a Japanese-British musician
 MU, musical group formed by Merrell Fankhauser and Jeff Cotton
 M.U. – The Best of Jethro Tull, a greatest hits album
 Planet Mu, an electronic music label

Other media 
 MU Press, an independent comic book publisher

Businesses and organizations

Businesses and brands
 Mu Dynamics, a company which makes hardware and software to test network services
 MU Press, an independent comic book publisher
 Isuzu MU Wizard, a compact sport/utility vehicle
 Micron Technology, Boise, Idaho, US, NASDAQ symbol
 China Eastern Airlines, Shanghai, China, IATA code

Other organizations
 Mothers' Union, a global Anglican women's organisation
 Musicians' Union (UK)
 Groupe μ, Belgian linguistics group

Language and scripts 
 Mu (letter), Μ or μ, Greek letter
Micro-, μ, metric prefix for one millionth
 Mu (kana), む or ム, a Japanese kana
 Mu (cuneiform), a sign in cuneiform writing
 Mu (negative), a word meaning "no" or "without" (Japanese: 無; Korean: 무)
 Middle Ukrainian, Ukrainian language 16th–18th century

Places 
 Mu River, a river in Burma (Myanmar)
 Mu River (Hokkaidō), a river in Japan
 Mù, a village in the Edolo municipality of Italy
 Mauritius (ISO 3166-1 alpha-2 country code MU)
 .mu, the country code top-level domain for Mauritius

Mythical places
 Mu (mythical lost continent), a mythical continent in the Pacific Ocean

Universities 
 Metropolitan University (disambiguation)

Australia 
 Macquarie University, Sydney, New South Wales
 Monash University, Melbourne, Victoria
 Murdoch University, Perth, Western Australia

India 
 Madras University, Chennai, India
 Mumbai University, Mumbai, India
 Manipur University, Imphal, India

United States 
 Marquette University, Milwaukee, Wisconsin
 Marshall University, Huntington, West Virginia
 Millersville University of Pennsylvania
 University of Missouri, Columbia, Missouri

Other countries 
 Mahidol University, Salaya, Thailand
 Mandalay University, Mandalay, Myanmar
 Masaryk University, Brno, Czech Republic
 Meiho University, Pingtung, Taiwan
 Misamis University, Ozamiz City, Misamis Occidental, Philippines
 Mondragon University, Mondragon, Spain
 Mzumbe University, Mzumbe, Tanzania

Names and people
 Mu (surname) (穆, 牧, 慕, 木, 母, 目, 沐, 睦 and 暮), Chinese surnames
 Mu family, a powerful Chinese family from the 14th to the 18th century
 Mu of Baekje (580–641), king of Baekje
 Mu of Balhae (died 737), king of Balhae from 718 to 737
 Marquis Mu of Cai, ruler of the state of Cai from 675 to 646 BC
 King Mu of Chu (died 614 BC), king of the state of Chu from 625 to 614 BC
 Emperor Mu of Jin (343–361), emperor of the Eastern Jin Dynasty
 Marquis Mu of Jin (died 812 BC), ruler of the state of Jin from c. 798 to 776 BC
 King Mu of Zhou (died 922 BC), king of the state of Zhou from c. 976 to 922 BC
 Mu Dan (1918–1977), Chinese poet and translator
 Athing Mu (born 2002), American middle-distance runner

Religion and philosophy 
 Mu (negative), 無, a concept in Buddhism
 Muism (Korean shamanism), the native religion of Korea
 Mu (shaman), a Korean priest
 Church of England in Hunters Hill, New South Wales, Australia ("early church code" used by NSW Registry of Births Deaths & Marriages)

Science, technology, and mathematics

Biology and medicine
 Mu phage, a bacteriophage of the family Myoviridae of double-stranded DNA non-enveloped contractile tail bacterial viruses
 Centimorgan, or "map unit", a unit of recombinant frequency in genetics
 Monitor unit (MU), a measure of absorbed dose from a linear accelerator in radiation therapy = 0.001 Gray
 SARS-CoV-2 Mu variant, one of the variants of SARS-CoV-2, the virus that causes COVID-19

Chemistry 
 Chemical potential, a form of potential energy that can be absorbed or released during a chemical reaction
 Bridging ligand, an atom that connects two or more metal centers in a complex (molecule)

Mathematics 
 MU puzzle, a puzzle in the book Gödel, Escher, Bach
 Minimalization operator (M operator), a function-building operator for General recursive function
 Möbius function, a multiplicative function in number theory and combinatorics
 Degree of membership in a fuzzy set
 The standard measure function name in measure theory
 Complex cobordism, an extraordinary cohomology theory

Measurement 
 Micro-, SI (metric) prefix denoting a factor of 10−6 (one millionth)
 Micrometre (deprecated as a single-character symbol)
 Million units of energy, a term used in India for a gigawatt-hour, see kilowatt-hour#Other energy-related units
 Mu (unit), a Chinese unit of area also spelled "mou", equivalent to 1/15 or about 0.066 hectares.

Physics 
 Coefficient of friction, used to approximate the force of friction
 Deformation (mechanics), as the "unit" of strain
 Electron mobility, relating the drift of electrons to the applied electric field across a material
 Linear density, a measure of mass per unit of length
 Magnetic dipole moment, a measure of the strength of a system's net magnetic source
 Mu-metal, a nickel-iron alloy with high magnetic permeability
 Muon, an elementary particle
 Muonium, exotic atoms made up of an antimuon and an electron
 Permeability (electromagnetism) coefficient, degree of magnetization of a material
 Proton-to-electron mass ratio, a dimensionless physical constant
 Reduced mass, the "effective" inertial mass appearing in the two-body problem
 Standard gravitational parameter of a celestial body
 Viscosity, the resistance of a fluid which is being deformed by stress

Other uses in science and technology
 μ, in evolutionary algorithms, the population size from which in each generation λ offspring will generate
 Mu (rocket family), a Japanese rocket family launched between 1966 and 2006
 Multiple unit, self-propelled train carriages capable of coupling with other units of similar type
 Olympus mju (stylised as μ[mju:]), series of a compact cameras

Other uses 
 Musician (United States Navy), an enlisted rating
 Mu, a type of icicle radish
 Manchester United F.C., a British football club
 MuseScore, a sheet music notation software
 /mu/, a board pertaining to music discussion on 4chan

See also 
 Moo (disambiguation)
 M (disambiguation)